Schandorff is a surname. Notable people with the surname include:

Axel Schandorff (1925–2016), Danish track cyclist
Maria Schandorff (1784–1848), Norwegian philanthropist and social educator
Silja Schandorff (born 1969), Danish ballerina